Gwynfor James Williams (born 1 February 1956) is a former rugby union player. He played at scrum half or centre but club appearances for Cardiff RFC were limited by the presence of rugby union legend Gareth Edwards and current rugby pundit and Williams' older brother, Brynmor Williams. Williams was considered a great prospect but injuries hampered his development and progress. Having played for Newport RFC, Cardiff RFC and Cross Keys RFC, he played for his home-town club Cardigan RFC before finishing his career at Aberystwyth RFC.

In the 1981 Snelling Sevens Championship, he was awarded the Everson Award.

Notes

1956 births
Living people
Aberystwyth RFC players
Cardiff RFC players
Cross Keys RFC players
Newport RFC players
Rugby union players from Neath
Welsh rugby union players
Rugby union centres